Click and Clack's As the Wrench Turns is an adult animated television series produced by Atomic Cartoons and airs on PBS. The series follows the adventures of the brothers Click and Clack from their auto repair shop, Car Talk Plaza. It stars Tom (Click) and Ray Magliozzi (Clack), also known as the Tappet Brothers, from National Public Radio's Car Talk. The show was the first primetime animated series for a general audience to be produced and aired by PBS.

The series debuted  on July 9, 2008, and additionally in various time slots depending on local station scheduling. The series aired its ten-episode season in two-episode blocks for five weeks. It ended on August 13, 2008 with 10 episodes.

Cast
 Tom Magliozzi - Click Tappet
 Ray Magliozzi - Clack Tappet
 Kelli O'Hara - Beth Totenbag
 Juan Carlos Hernández - Fidel
 Cornell Womack - Reggie "Crusty" Crustwood
 Barbara Rosenblat - Sal

Production
Executive producer Howard K. Grossman began pitching a television series based on Car Talk in 2001. On July 11, 2007, PBS announced that it had greenlit the series for debut in the summer of 2008. This is the first prime-time animated series in the history of PBS. While at first a direct adaptation of the radio show had been proposed, the final product is an animated sitcom featuring a new cast of fictional characters alongside the radio-show hosting Click and Clack.

The opening theme and other music for the series are produced by Carl Finch and composed, arranged, and performed by Finch and his Grammy-award-winning band, Brave Combo.

Episodes

DVD releases

PBS Home Video and Paramount Home Entertainment released the entire run of As the Wrench Turns on DVD. The two-disc set was released in the United States and Canada on September 30, 2008.

Reception
Click and Clack's As the Wrench Turns received a largely negative response, with The New York Times commenting that "television seems to flatten and confine" Tom and Ray's spontaneity and that while the series is "indisputably adorable" it "lacks the magic of the Magliozzis unplugged." The Boston Herald opined that fans of Car Talk will be "excited to hear that Tom and Ray Magliozzi have expanded to PBS and television. Until they see the show." The show is described as "silly like a bad Saturday morning cartoon" and that the Magliozzi brothers are portrayed as "low-grade scam artists instead of the cheery, charming guys we know they are."

Christopher Kulik of DVD Verdict wrote in his review of the 2008 Paramount DVD release: "As a long-time devotee of Car Talk, I found this series to be a mixed bag. The humor is certainly there, and the Magliozzis' comic punch is still hitting hard, except their famous improvisation and spontaneity is practically thrown out the window. The result is Click & Clack 2.0, as the friendly voices are there but not the belly laughs or jolly merriment the boys' audibly display every Saturday morning. The out-there stories themselves set up some big laughs, like when the boys' discover pasta as an alternative energy source for automobiles, [pissed] off the local Mafioso in the process. Others lack any ingenuity whatsoever. The animation itself harks back to the 60s and 70s: very dim and dry, lacks real color and pizzazz, occasionally rough around the edges. Nothing special, unless you want to return to that old-fashioned, old-school look which was prevalent in George of the Jungle. Since the humor will whisk over children's heads, it's clear this show was created specifically for the older crowd, ones who are too slow to catch every gag in Family Guy. The show does earn points for its rich character design, courtesy of Stephen Silver, who also did the Clerks series with Kevin Smith.

References

External links 
 

2000s American adult animated television series
2000s American sitcoms
2000s American workplace comedy television series
2008 American television series debuts
2008 American television series endings
2000s Canadian adult animated television series
2000s Canadian sitcoms
2000s Canadian workplace comedy television series
2008 Canadian television series debuts
2008 Canadian television series endings
American adult animated comedy television series
American animated sitcoms
Animated television series about brothers
Canadian adult animated comedy television series
Canadian animated sitcoms
English-language television shows
PBS original programming
Television shows set in Massachusetts